The 2000 ABN AMRO World Tennis Tournament was a tennis tournament played on indoor hard courts. It was the 28th edition of the event known that year as the ABN AMRO World Tennis Tournament, and was part of the ATP International Series Gold of the 2000 ATP Tour. It took place at the Rotterdam Ahoy indoor sporting arena in Rotterdam, Netherlands, from 14 February through 20 February 2000.

The singles draw was led by ATP No. 2, Australian Open runner-up, Moscow titlist and Rotterdam defending champion Yevgeny Kafelnikov, Australian Open quarterfinalist, and recent Dubai winner Nicolas Kiefer, and Australian Open semifinalist, Auckland titlist Magnus Norman. Also present were Lyon and Indianapolis champion Nicolás Lapentti, Rotterdam defending finalist Tim Henman, Thomas Enqvist, Greg Rusedski and Cédric Pioline. Pioline won the singles title.

Finals

Singles

 Cédric Pioline defeated  Tim Henman, 6–7(3-7), 6–4, 7–6(7-4)
It was Cédric Pioline's 1st title of the year, and his 4th overall.

Doubles

 David Adams /  John-Laffnie de Jager defeated  Tim Henman /  Yevgeny Kafelnikov 5–7, 6–2, 6–3

References

External links
Official website
ITF tournament details

 
ABN AMRO World Tennis Tournament
ABN AMRO World Tennis Tournament
ABN AMRO World Tennis Tournament